Salhouse is a village and civil parish in the Broads in the English county of Norfolk. For the purposes of local government, the parish falls within the district of Broadland although areas adjoining the river and broad fall into the executive area of the Broads Authority.

Churches
Salhouse All Saints church, which is thatched and believed to date mainly from the 14th century (little remaining of an older chapel on the site), stands on a hill beside the Salhouse-Wroxham Road (B1140). The church contains among other features an oak rood screen, a unique sacring bell which hangs in the chancel and dates from the reign of Queen Mary, and two coffin lids discovered under the nave floor in 1839 and dated to the 13th century. There is also a red brick Baptist church in Chapel Loke, off Lower Street, which dates from 1802.

Other buildings and facilities
To the west of All Saints Church stands the grade II listed Salhouse Hall, now uninhabited, built in red brick with limestone detailing. Parts of this building may date from the 16th century although it is mostly 18th century with 19th-century Gothic style remodelling. The village also features the Bell Inn, a 17th-century public house and the Lodge Inn, which is located halfway between Salhouse and Wroxham. Salhouse is served by Salhouse railway station, which is on the Bittern Line from Norwich to Cromer and Sheringham and once featured two waiting rooms, although they are no longer in regular use. Salhouse has a post office, Village store and Coffee shop in Lower Street and several other small businesses including kennels and a Potter.

Salhouse Broad
The 32-acre Salhouse Broad, lying about half a mile to the north of the village, is privately owned and jointly managed with the local community. It is accessible by boat from the River Bure and via a footpath from the village.

Toponymy
Salhouse is first recorded in 1291 as Salhus. The first element is believed to derive from Old English salh "sallow", a kind of willow. The word still exists in dial. English saugh. Sallow descends itself from OE inflexional salg- (ME salwe).

The second element is the Old English hūs or Old Norse hús "house".

Homonymy with Sahurs (Normandy, Salhus ar. 1024) in the low Seine valley, which shows together with other place-names and anthroponyms in Normandy, that there were Anglo-Saxons among the Danish settlers.

A further variation on the spelling may be seen as "Psalhous" in 1452.

Rackheath Eco Town

During 2008, proposals were made for a very controversial new eco-town, to contain over 3000 homes, to be built in Rackheath and Salhouse. The proposals have attracted much criticism, mainly because it is to be built on a greenfield site, within a mile of The Broads National Park.

References

External links

 
Information from Genuki Norfolk on Salhouse.
Salhouse village web site

Broadland
Villages in Norfolk
Civil parishes in Norfolk